Neppis is a competitive outdoor sport played in Finland, simulating race driving. It is played with small toy cars on sand.

The "official" neppis car is made of plastic and resembles a 1950s racing car, with metal axles and sturdy black plastic wheels. The "golden era" of neppis, in the sandpits of Finnish residential areas, was the late 1970s. The sport was especially popular among boys.

Retro-spirited adults have warmed up the sport again. It is advertised as the cleanest motor sport. For example, the counterevent to Rally Finland (Jyväskylän Suurajot), called "Small Rally Finland" (Jyväskylän Pienajot) was based on neppis. Originally intended as a game for children, the sport has been fit into an adult taste: the size of the cars has increased and they can be self-made, bringing rise to the challenging side of the sport, for example MRC neppis. Neppis cars can also be tuned by cutting away parts of the chassis or adding weight to the bottom, however in some instances, the local rules forbid tuning.

Neppis is played on a race track made of sand, which is typically made by smoothing out the sand with the sole. This makes the width of the track approximately equal to the length of an adult foot. The track can include spring-outs and pits. On his/her turn, each competitor "neps" his/her car by tapping it with the side of a bent index finger. Most commonly, there are three "neps" per turn. The person to circle the entire track the fastest wins. If the car runs off the track or is turned upside down (goes into a so-called kelli), or turns a full circle by passing through an upside-down position (a so-called half-kelli), the car has to be replaced where the turn started, or into a special kelli place.

External links
 Neppis weekly
 Neppaajat.com

Outdoor games
Sport in Finland